Nanthaniel Orlando Murray (February 7, 1834 – July 27, 1882) was an American steamboat owner and politician.

Born in Evans, Erie County, New York, Evans settled in Wisconsin in 1848. He lived in Fox Lake, Wisconsin. In 1855, Murray moved to Pepin, Pepin County, Wisconsin. Murray managed a steamboat on Lake Pepin. Murray served as justice of the peace. He also served as sheriff and under sheriff for Pepin County. In 1882, Murray served in the Wisconsin State Assembly and was a Republican. Murray died in Lake City, Iowa while still in office.

Notes

External links

1834 births
1882 deaths
People from Evans, New York
People from Pepin, Wisconsin
Businesspeople from Wisconsin
Wisconsin sheriffs
Republican Party members of the Wisconsin State Assembly
People from Fox Lake, Wisconsin
19th-century American politicians
19th-century American businesspeople